Robert Bruce Verga (born September 7, 1945) is an American retired professional basketball player, who played in the American Basketball Association and the National Basketball Association (NBA) from 1967 to 1974. He was a  guard and played college basketball at Duke University.

Verga owns the Duke men's basketball record for points per game (26.7) in a single season, which he achieved in 1967.

Verga was drafted by the NBA's St. Louis Hawks in the third round of the 1967 NBA draft and by the Kentucky Colonels in the 1967 ABA Draft.  Verga opted to play in the ABA and averaged 23.7 points per game in his rookie season for the Dallas Chaparrals.  Verga averaged 18.8 points per game in his second ABA season, with the Houston Mavericks.  Verga played the next two seasons with the Carolina Cougars, averaging 27.5 points per game during the 1969–70 season (in which he made his only appearance in the ABA All Star Game) and 18.8 the following season. After averaging 17.5 points per game for the Pittsburgh Condors in the 1971–72 season Verga finished his career with the NBA's Portland Trail Blazers.

References

External links
 
 College stats at Sports Reference
 NBA stats at Basketball Reference

1945 births
Living people
All-American college men's basketball players
American men's basketball players
Basketball players from New Jersey
Carolina Cougars players
Dallas Chaparrals players
Denver Rockets players
Duke Blue Devils men's basketball players
Houston Mavericks players
Kentucky Colonels draft picks
New York Nets players
People from Neptune Township, New Jersey
Pittsburgh Condors players
Point guards
Portland Trail Blazers players
Sportspeople from Monmouth County, New Jersey
St. Louis Hawks draft picks
St. Rose High School alumni